Pedro Tiago Pereira Batista (born 19 October 1992) is a Portuguese footballer who last played for AR São Martinho as a defender.

External links

1992 births
Living people
Portuguese footballers
Association football defenders
Liga Portugal 2 players
Segunda Divisão players
S.C. Freamunde players
Rebordosa A.C. players
A.R. São Martinho players